Thalictrum aquilegiifolium is a species of flowering plant in the buttercup family Ranunculaceae. It is known by the common names Siberian columbine meadow-rue, columbine meadow-rue, French meadow-rue, and greater meadow-rue. Its native range extends through Europe and temperate Asia, with a naturalized distribution in North America limited to New York and Ontario.

In early summer it bears clusters of fluffy pink flowers in flat-topped panicles.

The plant contains an alkaloid thalidisine, which is also present in other Thalictrum species.

References

External links
 

aquilegiifolium
Plants described in 1753
Taxa named by Carl Linnaeus